Bowkeria cymosa, the Transvaal shellflower bush. is a species of flowering plants in the family Stilbaceae. It is a leafy, bushy shrub, up to 8 feet in height, endemic to South Africa.

References

  J. Linn. Soc., Bot. 25: 390 1890.
 JSTOR entry
 Dave's Garden

cymosa